Miroslav "Meho" Brozović (26 August 1917 – 5 October 2006) was a Bosnian Croat professional footballer and football manager who played international football for the Yugoslavia national team, as well as the national team fielded by the Independent State of Croatia during World War II. He played as a defender.

Club career
Brozović began his career with local sides JŠK and Zrinjski Mostar before moving to Građanski Zagreb in 1935. With Građanski, he won the Yugoslav First League in seasons 1936–37 and 1939–40 and Yugoslav Cup in 1938 and 1940.

The Communist authorities disbanded Građanski Zagreb, forcing Brozović to move to the newly formed army club Partizan, with whom he won the league title in the 1946–47 season. He also won the Yugoslav Cup in 1947.

From 1948 to 1953, Brozović played for Sarajevo. In the 1948–49 season, he as a player-manager, won the Yugoslav Second League with Sarajevo. He became a club legend at the club. He ended his  playing career at Sarajevo in 1953.

International career
Brozović debuted for the Yugoslavia national team in 1940. However, with the establishment of the Independent State of Croatia in 1941, he began playing for the Croatian national team. He suited up for Croatia 17 times during the war before communist Yugoslavia came into existence after the war. 

Brozović won a silver medal for Yugoslavia in football at the 1948 Summer Olympics. He played four matches and scored no goals.

His final international for Yugoslavia was an August 1948 Balkan Cup match against Poland.

Managerial career
Brozović started managing Sarajevo in 1948 as a player-manager. He won the Yugoslav Second League in the 1948–49 season. After ending his playing career in 1953, he became a full-time manager. Brozović left Sarajevo in 1956, and was immediately named manager of Sarajevo's fierce city rival Željezničar. Brozović promoted the club to the Yugoslav First League in 1957. He managed Željezničar until 1958.

In 1959, he once again became the manager of his favorite, Sarajevo. He stayed at the club until 1961. In 1963, he was manager of Borac Banja Luka. Five years later, in 1966, for the fourth time in his career, Brozović became the manager of Sarajevo. As manager, he won the club's historic, first ever Yugoslav First League title in the 1966–67 season. After the end of the season, he left Sarajevo in the summer of 1967. He would return to Sarajevo once again and manage the club from 1969 to 1970.

Death
Brozović died in Mostar, Bosnia and Herzegovina in 2006, at the age of 89.

Honours

Player
Građanski Zagreb 
Yugoslav First League: 1936–37, 1939–40
Yugoslav Cup: 1937–38, 1940

Partizan
Yugoslav First League: 1946–47
Yugoslav Cup: 1947

Sarajevo
Yugoslav Second League: 1948–49

Yugoslavia
Summer Olympics Runners-up: 1948

Manager
Sarajevo 
Yugoslav First League: 1966–67
Yugoslav Second League: 1948–49

Željezničar
Yugoslav Second League: 1956–57 (zone II A)

References

External links
 

Miroslav Brozović at Reprezentacija.rs 
Miroslav Brozović at legends section at fksinfo.com 

1917 births
2006 deaths
Sportspeople from Mostar
People from the Condominium of Bosnia and Herzegovina
Croats of Bosnia and Herzegovina
Association football defenders
Bosnia and Herzegovina footballers
Croatian footballers
Croatia international footballers
Yugoslav footballers
Yugoslavia international footballers
Olympic footballers of Yugoslavia
Olympic silver medalists for Yugoslavia
Footballers at the 1948 Summer Olympics
Medalists at the 1948 Summer Olympics
Olympic medalists in football
Dual internationalists (football)
HŠK Građanski Zagreb players
FK Partizan players
FK Sarajevo players
Yugoslav First League players
Yugoslav First League managers
Yugoslav football managers
Bosnia and Herzegovina football managers
Croatian football managers
FK Sarajevo managers
FK Željezničar Sarajevo managers
FK Borac Banja Luka managers